Franz Foidl (born 25 October 1906, date of death unknown) was an Austrian wrestler. He competed in the men's Greco-Roman light heavyweight at the 1936 Summer Olympics.

References

1906 births
Year of death missing
Austrian male sport wrestlers
Olympic wrestlers of Austria
Wrestlers at the 1936 Summer Olympics
Place of birth missing